Somchandbhai Solanki (31 December 1920 - 22 May 1985) was an Indian politician and was a Member of the Parliament of India in the 4th Lok Sabha and 5th Lok Sabha. He represented the Gandhinagar (Lok Sabha constituency) of Gujarat and was a member of the Indian National Congress.

Other positions
Solanki was a social worker and Chairman for Krishna Kunj Cooperative Housing Society Ltd. Other titles he has held are as follows: 
 Ahmedabad and Nilkanth Consumers' Cooperative Society - President
 Gujarat Pachchhat Verg Congress
 Kadi Pachchhat Verg Kalabani Uttejak Mandal, Kadi
 Gandhi Vidyarthi Ashram, Kadi 
 Kadi Taluka Yuvak Sangh - Vice-President
 Morarji Satkar Committee 
 Pachchhat Varg Kalyan Samaj

References

People from Gandhinagar district
1920 births
Indian National Congress politicians
1985 deaths
India MPs 1967–1970
India MPs 1971–1977
Lok Sabha members from Gujarat